Kenton is a city in and the county seat of Hardin County, Ohio, United States, located in the west-central part of Ohio about 57 mi (92 km) northwest of Columbus and 70 mi (113 km) south of Toledo. Its population was 7,947 at the 2020 census. The city was named for frontiersman Simon Kenton of Kentucky and Ohio.

History
Kenton was originally the site of Fort McArthur, erected in 1812 by Colonel Duncan McArthur as one of the forts along the line of General William Hull's march against the British headquarters at Fort Detroit during the War of 1812.

In 1845, Kenton was incorporated as a village; it became a city in 1886.  The city was named after frontiersman Simon Kenton.

The city began as a center for agricultural trade, then in the late 19th century, developed industry common to America of the time.  From 1890 to 1952, Kenton was home to the Kenton Hardware Company, manufacturers of locks, cast-iron toys, and the very popular Gene Autry toy cap guns.

International Car Company, a manufacturer of rail cabooses, operated in Kenton for many years. In 1975, it was purchased by Paccar, a manufacturer of medium- and heavy-duty trucks. In 1983, Paccar closed down the business, noting a decrease in demand for rail equipment.

The 2001 CSX 8888 incident involving an unmanned freight train ended in Kenton.

Geography

Climate

Demographics

2010 census
At the 2010 census, 8,262 people in 3,351 households, including 2,092 families, lived in the city.  The population density was 1,836 persons per square mile (712.2/km).  The 3,773 housing units had an average density of 838.4 per square mile (325.3/km).  The racial makeup of the city was 96.2% White, 0.9% African American, 0.2% Native American, 0.3% Asian, 0.9% from other races, and 1.4% from two or more races.  Hispanic or Latino people of any race were 0.90%.

Of the 3,351 households, 29.2% had children under 18 living with them, 40.1% were married couples living together, 6.6% had a male householder with no wife present, 15.8% had a female householder with no husband present, and 37.6% were not families. About 31.9% of households were one person and 14.3% were one person 65 or older.  The average household size was 2.40, and the average family size was 2.97.

The age distribution was 28.1% under 20, 6.5% from 20 to 24, 25.1% from 25 to 44, 24.8% from 45 to 64, and 15.5% 65 or older.  The median age was 37.2 years.  For every 100 females, there were 88.8 males.

2000 census
At the 2000 census, 8,336 people in 3,495 households, including 2,149 families, resided in the city. The population density was 1,860.6 people per square mile (718.4/km). The 3,795 housing units at an average density of 847.0/sq mi (327.1/km).  The racial makeup of the city was 97.11% White, 0.91% African American, 0.28% Native American, 0.37% Asian, 0.32% from other races, and 1.01% from two or more races. Hispanic or Latino people of any race were 0.90%.

Of the 3,495 households, 29.9% had children under 18 living with them, 44.0% were married couples living together, 12.9% had a female householder with no husband present, and 38.5% were not families. About 33.4% of households were one person, and 15.3% were one person  65 or older. The average household size was 2.34, and the average family size was 2.95.

The age distribution was 25.5% under 18, 9.0% from 18 to 24, 28.3% from 25 to 44, 21.3% from 45 to 64, and 15.9% were 65 or older. The median age was 36 years. For every 100 females, there were 87.7 males. For every 100 females18 and over, there were 83.8 males.

The median household income was $29,065 and the median family income was $37,170. Males had a median income of $31,225 versus $19,413 for females. The per capita income for the city was $16,324. About 11.6% of families and 16.2% of the population were below the poverty line, including 19.0% of those under age 18 and 17.2% of those 65 or over.

Arts and culture
Kenton has a variety of attractions and activities.  The Hardin County Courthouse is a historical site in the center of the public square.  Kenton has one public library, the Mary Lou Johnson Hardin County District Library, which was formerly located in a 1905 Carnegie library.  The city's Hardin County Historical Museum is located in a near north side historic district.

Kenton's large Amish population sells produce, baked goods, and furniture.  The Hardin County Fair is held during the week of Labor Day.

Parks and recreation
The city offers camping and fishing at Salsbury Park located west of Kenton on Ohio State Route 67. This city park and reservoir was named in honor of former Mayor Helen Salsbury.

Education
Kenton is home to the Kenton City School District, which includes an elementary school, Kenton Middle School, and Kenton High School.  Kenton Elementary School opened in 2014;  it replaced the three previous elementary and one kindergarten buildings.  Simon Kenton, a special-education school, is run by a different board of education and is associated with the Harco Workshop for Developmental Disabilities.

The local high school is Kenton High School, with the nickname the "Wildcats". The Wildcat football team won consecutive state championships in 2001 and 2002 in division IV, was a runner-up in 2011 in Division IV, and as a runner-up in 2003 in Division III.

Media
Two media outlets operate in Kenton:  WKTN, a radio station, and The Kenton Times, a daily newspaper.

Notable people
 Jon Cross, state representative, Ohio House of Representatives (R-83rd District)
 John R. Goodin, Democratic congressman from Kansas
 William Lawrence, Republican congressman
 Fred Machetanz, writer, artist 
 Jacob Parrott, first recipient of the Medal of Honor
 Paul Robinson, creator of the long-running Etta Kett comic strip for King Features Syndicate
 Luther M. Strong, US representative from Ohio

References

External links

 
Cities in Ohio
Cities in Hardin County, Ohio
1845 establishments in Ohio
Populated places established in 1845
County seats in Ohio